The Tournaisis, or Tournai (Flemish: Doornik), a territory in the Low Countries in present-day Belgium, is one of Europe's oldest town centres. Located in the Wallonia region of Belgium on the Scheldt River (French: L'Escaut), northwest of Mons, Tournai residents are primarily French-speaking. It is home to some of the oldest and best preserved medieval architecture in Europe, notably the Cathédrale Notre Dame and the Belfry of Tournai, a belltower built in 1188, both of which are designated UNESCO World Heritage sites. The river Scheldt's access to the sea made Tournai a trading hub in the Middle Ages.

History 
Tournai was important to the Romans since the time of Saint Piat in the 3rd century, and it has origins that date back to 60 AD. It has changed hands many times since. Tournai was seized by the Salic Franks in the 5th century under the Frankish king Clovis I, the first king of the Franks. It became the capital of the Merovingian territory. 

From the 860s, it was largely controlled by the counts of Flanders until France seized it in 1188. Soon after, construction of the Belfry of Tournai began.

Despite French control, Tournai retained a form of autonomy under the French. In 1513, it fell to England but was returned to France in 1518, and in 1521 was taken by Charles V, who attached it to the Netherlands, then a Spanish Habsburg province. From 1543 until the 1560s, it was a favoured locations for anti-Spanish rebels until Alessandro Farnese recaptured it for Spain after the siege of 1581. In 1667, it was taken by Louis XIV and later transferred to the Austrian Habsburgs by the Treaty of Utrecht (1713). Recaptured by the French in 1745, Austria gained control in 1748.. It was again French from 1794 to 1814.
Tournai was the site of a dramatic liberation during World War I, in 1918. The German Sixth Army moved its headquarters from Lille to Tournai in September 1918, destroying bridges and setting up a lookout point at Tournai's famous. Many of its residents evacuated. Following British shelling that fall, British troops retook Tournai. A statue honoring Tournai's greatest heroine of the war, the Belgian spyGabrielle Petit, stands today near the St. Brice church.

Main sights to see 
Tournai is best known for The Belfry of Tournai, a freestanding belfry, or bell tower (72 metres, or 236 ft, in height), that is one of the oldest and best preserved belfries in Belgium. It was built in 1188. Featuring a 256-step stairway, it is part of a set of Belfries of Belgium and France, and in 1999 it was registered on the UNESCO World Heritage List for its architecture and for the importance in the rise of municipal power in Europe. Over the centuries since, it has served as a watch tower, a clock tower, a place of announcements, a stronghold for town charters, and a prison. A fire damaged the building in 1391, but it was later repaired. The structure remained largely the same over the following centuries, with the exception of occasional restorations and additions. 

Cathédrale de Notre Dame is an ornate cathedral of the 11th and 12th centuries, that is considered one of the finest in Europe. With five towers, a Gothic choir, and 13th-century reliquary shrines, it houses one of the most valuable collections of church treasures in Belgium.

Grand Place is a town square, bordered by 17th-century buildings. A statue of Christine de la Lalaing, a local 16th-century heroine, stands in the center of the square.

The Bridge of Holes (Pont des Trous), a medieval bridge over the river Scheldt named for its three arches, was built between 1281 and 1304. It is one of only three remaining 13th-century military bridges in the world. It was partially reconstructed in the 20th century to repair damage it took from by British bombardment during the World War II. In 2019, it was widened to allow the passage of larger ships through the city.

Musée des Beaux Arts, or Musée Horta, is a museum designed by Belgium's Art Nouveau maestro Victor Horta. Completed in 1928, it includes from the 15 century on, including works by Monet, Manet, Seurat, and many of the great Belgian painters.

Musée de Folklore is a 23-room museum housed in Le Mason Tournaisienne that depicts daily life in the history of Tournai.

Musée de Tapisserie is a museum celebrating the region's history of tapestry, notably from the 15th and 16th centuries.

Musée des Arts de la Marionnette, located in a 19th century mansion, is a museum with a collection of over 2,500 puppets from around the world.

Musée de Archeólogie is a museum with archeological remains dating to the Gallo-Roman and Frankish periods.

Art and culture 
Tournai was notable for tapestry and copperware in the Middle Ages, and for carpet weaving in the 18th century. 

Quarrying is important locally, and steel, leather goods, and hosiery are manufactured. 

Tournai was also renowned for a medieval school of sculptors. It was one of the great centres of Early Netherlandish (or Flemish) painting. Robert Campin settled there and attracted students, including Rogier van der Weyden and Jacques Daret.well as for the painter Rogier van der Weyden.

It also produced the important Franco-Flemish composers Pierre de la Rue and Marbrianus de Orto.

Geography 
The Tournaisis was situated between two larger neighbours: the County of Flanders, and the County of Hainaut. Its origins lie in a Roman pagus within the civitas of the Menapii, of which it became the chief city in late Roman times. It had some independence and power in the Middle Ages because it became the seat of the Bishopric of Tournai.

The territory, like that of Flanders, but unlike neighbouring Hainaut, was part of early medieval West Francia, which evolved into France. However, this rule was not always effective. It came under French rule during the reign of Philip IV of France, and remained under French control until it was conquered by Emperor Charles V in 1521. It remained part of the Habsburg Netherlands until 1789, eventually becoming part of modern Belgium.

The Tournaisis was considered part of the Seventeen Provinces.

References

Seventeen Provinces
Geographic history of Belgium
Former polities in the Netherlands
Tournai